Champaklal Narotamdas Mehta (1907 – 13 December 1981) was an Indian cricketer who played for Bombay, Gujarat and Hindus in 1930s.

Mehta was born in Surat and studied in the St. Xavier's College, Mumbai. He made his debut in the Bombay Quadrangular in 1929 but the tournament was suspended for the next four seasons. In support of the non-cooperation movement, Vijay Merchant, L. P. Jai and Mehta refused to take part in the trials for the Indian tour to England in 1932. He took part in the Test trials for the 1933-34 series.

Mehta died of a heart attack in Bombay in 1981.

References

1907 births
1981 deaths
People from Surat
Indian cricketers
Hindus cricketers
Mumbai cricketers
Gujarat cricketers